In mathematics, a nonnegative matrix, written
 
is a matrix in which all the elements are equal to or greater than zero, that is,
 
A positive matrix is a matrix in which all the elements are strictly greater than zero. The set of positive matrices is a subset of all non-negative matrices. While such matrices are commonly found, the term is only occasionally used due to the possible confusion with positive-definite matrices, which are different. A matrix which is both non-negative and is positive semidefinite is called a doubly non-negative matrix.

A rectangular non-negative matrix can be approximated by a decomposition with two other non-negative matrices via non-negative matrix factorization.

Eigenvalues and eigenvectors of square positive matrices are described by the Perron–Frobenius theorem.

Properties
The trace and every row and column sum/product of a nonnegative matrix is nonnegative.

Inversion 
The inverse of any non-singular M-matrix  is a non-negative matrix. If the non-singular M-matrix is also symmetric then it is called a Stieltjes matrix. 

The inverse of a non-negative matrix is usually not non-negative. The exception is the non-negative monomial matrices: a non-negative matrix has non-negative inverse if and only if it is a (non-negative) monomial matrix. Note that thus the inverse of a positive matrix is not positive or even non-negative, as positive matrices are not monomial, for dimension .

Specializations 
There are a number of groups of matrices that form specializations of non-negative matrices, e.g. stochastic matrix; doubly stochastic matrix; symmetric non-negative matrix.

See also 
 Metzler matrix

Bibliography 
 Abraham Berman, Robert J. Plemmons, Nonnegative Matrices in the Mathematical Sciences, 1994, SIAM. .
A. Berman and R. J. Plemmons, Nonnegative Matrices in the Mathematical Sciences, Academic Press, 1979 (chapter 2), 
R.A. Horn and C.R. Johnson, Matrix Analysis, Cambridge University Press, 1990 (chapter 8).
 
 
 Henryk Minc, Nonnegative matrices, John Wiley&Sons, New York, 1988, 
 Seneta, E. Non-negative matrices and Markov chains. 2nd rev. ed., 1981, XVI, 288 p., Softcover Springer Series in Statistics. (Originally published by Allen & Unwin Ltd., London, 1973) 
 Richard S. Varga 2002 Matrix Iterative Analysis, Second ed. (of 1962 Prentice Hall edition), Springer-Verlag.

Matrices